José Froilán González (October 5, 1922 – June 15, 2013) was an Argentine racing driver, particularly notable for scoring Ferrari's first win in a Formula One World Championship race at the 1951 British Grand Prix. He made his Formula One debut for Scuderia Achille Varzi in the 1950 Monaco Grand Prix. His last Grand Prix was the 1960 Argentine Grand Prix.

González competed in 26 World Championship Formula One Grands Prix over nine seasons (1950–1957 and 1960) and numerous non-Championship events. In the 26 World Championship races, González scored two victories (the 1951 British Grand Prix and the 1954 British Grand Prix), seven second-place finishes, six third-place finishes, three pole positions, six fastest laps, and 72  points. He won the 1951 Coppa Acerbo, in 1954 the 24 Hours of Le Mans with Maurice Trintignant, and the Portuguese Grand Prix for Ferrari.

Physically well built, González was nicknamed The Pampas Bull (by his English fans) and El Cabezón (Fat Head, by his Argentine fans). His close friends, like Juan-Manuel Fangio and Roberto Mieres, called him Pepe.

Sixtieth anniversary tribute 

On 10 July 2011, during the British Grand Prix meeting, González was honoured by the Ferrari team and the FIA on the 60th anniversary of Ferrari's first Formula One World Championship race victory. As part of the celebration, Ferrari driver Fernando Alonso drove González' Ferrari 375 F1 for four laps of the Silverstone track. Later that day, Alonso won the British Grand Prix in his Ferrari 150º Italia.

Death
He died in Buenos Aires from respiratory failure, aged 90, after a downturn in health following a heart attack earlier in 2013.

Racing record

Complete Formula One World Championship results
(key) (Races in bold indicate pole position; races in italics indicate fastest lap)

* Shared drive.
** Joint fastest lap.
† González started the race in a Ferrari 553 Squalo, but took over one of his teammates' 625 during the race.

Complete Formula One non-championship results
(key) (Races in bold indicate pole position; Races in italics indicate fastest lap)

1Gonzalez drove the 553 in the heat and the 625 in the final of the 1954 BRDC International Trophy.

Complete 24 Hours of Le Mans results

Other race results

 Grand Prix of Interlagos: 3rd, (1952), Formula Libre
 Grand Prix of Rio de Janeiro 1st, (1952), Formula Libre
 Grand Prix of Buenos Aires 1st, (1951), Formula Libre
 Glover Trophy: 1st, (1952), Formula Libre
 Supercortemaggiore: 2nd, (1954)
 Monsanto Park Circuit: 1st, (1954)
 1000 miles of Buenos Aires: 3rd, (1956), 1st (1960)
 500 miles of Rafaela: 1st, (1958), 1st (1959)

References

External links
  Video: Tribute to Froilán González by Fernando Alonso

1922 births
Argentine racing drivers
Argentine Formula One drivers
Formula One race winners
Enrico Platé Formula One drivers
Ferrari Formula One drivers
Maserati Formula One drivers
Vanwall Formula One drivers
Turismo Carretera drivers
People from Arrecifes
24 Hours of Le Mans drivers
24 Hours of Le Mans winning drivers
World Sportscar Championship drivers
2013 deaths
Deaths from respiratory failure
Sportspeople from Buenos Aires Province